Liatris aestivalis, also known as the summer gayfeather, is a plant species in the family Asteraceae and genus Liatris. The specific epithet, aestivalis, is derived from Latin and means "pertaining to the summer".

Description
It grows from rounded corms that produce hairless stems 20 to 65 centimeters tall. Plants have dark-purple colored flowers in dense heads that are closely grouped together, forming a  cylindrical-shaped spike-like collection surrounding the stems. The basal and cauline leaves have one nerve and are linear to linear-lanceolate in shape. It flowers in July and August, sometimes into September. The seed are produced in cypselae fruits that are 4.5 to 6 millimeters long with feathery bristle-like pappi.

Distribution
It is native to Oklahoma and Texas in the United States, where it is found in habitats that range from limestone outcrops to slopes and bases of slopes with shallow soils.

References

Aestivalis
Flora of Oklahoma
Flora of Texas
Flora of North America
Flora without expected TNC conservation status